The Rosava is a river in Ukraine located in the Dnieper Upland, a left-bank tributary of the Ros. It is 90 km long and drains a basin area of 1,720 km². The river flows through Kyiv Oblast and Cherkasy Oblast.

Cities and towns on the Rosava
Kaharlyk
Myronivka

References
Encyclopedia of Ukraine - Rosava River

Dnieper Upland
Rivers of Kyiv Oblast
Rivers of Cherkasy Oblast